The Gift is a 2015 Scottish short film by 27 Ten Productions based on Elvis Presley's 11th birthday. It was directed and written by Gabriel Robertson and stars Brady Permenter, Amye Gousset, and Xander Berkeley. It was produced in Presley's hometown of Tupelo, Mississippi.

Plot 
Elvis and his mother, Gladys, drive to Tupelo Hardware Co. for him to choose a birthday present for his 11th birthday. Although Elvis had always had a bike in his eye, he instead chooses a rifle, much to his mother's dismay. After she prohibits him from buying the gun, the store owner takes him outside and persuades him to buy a guitar instead. Elvis accepts the instrument and starts to become attached to it on the way home. The film ends with Elvis entering their house, with a sign saying "Presley" on the front door.

Cast
 Brady Permenter as Boy
 Amye Gousset as Mother
 Xander Berkeley as Forrest Bobo

Production 
The Gift was filmed on location in Tupelo, Mississippi. The credits include a recording of Presley's single "That's All Right".

Reception 
The film has received mostly positive reviews.

Awards

References

External links 
 
 

2010s English-language films